Gerald Mervin Vanenburg (born 5 March 1964) is a Dutch former professional footballer who played as a right winger.

He amassed Eredivisie totals of 372 games and 112 goals for Ajax and PSV combined, winning fifteen major titles between the two clubs, including the 1988 European Cup with the latter. Subsequently he played in Japan, France and Germany, in a 20-year professional career.

Vanenburg earned more than 40 caps for the Netherlands, appearing at the 1990 World Cup and Euro 1988 and winning the latter tournament.

Club career

Ajax
Born in Utrecht of Surinamese descent, Vanenburg finished his football formation with AFC Ajax, and made his Eredivisie debuts exactly one month after his 17th birthday, against ADO Den Haag. He finished his first season with 11 games and three goals, being soon dubbed Vaantje and Geraldinho for his above-average skills.

Vanenburg became an undisputed starter for the Amsterdam side shortly after, providing countless assists for strikers Marco van Basten and Wim Kieft and adding 30 himself in two seasons combined as the club won back-to-back national championships; before leaving in June 1986, he scored in double digits in two more seasons. Himself, van Basten, Kieft were amongst a steady stream of talented youngsters that also included Frank Rijkaard that helped to the conquest of three league titles between 1982 and 1985.

PSV
Vanenburg signed for PSV Eindhoven for 1986–87, netting nine goals in 34 matches in his first season, which ended in league conquest. He was part of the team that won the treble the following campaign, with the player appearing in the final of the European Cup and converting his penalty shootout attempt against S.L. Benfica. The backbone of this treble winning team was formed by many of his former teammates at Ajax, including Frank Arnesen, Kieft, Ronald Koeman and Søren Lerby.

Having rejected a lucrative move to A.S. Roma, Vanenburg played and scored regularly for PSV in the following five seasons, winning a further three leagues and two Dutch Cups. He appeared in nearly 500 official games between the two clubs, scoring almost 150 goals. He was also one of five European players to ever achieve the feat of winning four competitions – three with their club and one with the national team – in the same year, the others being teammates Berry van Aerle, Hans van Breukelen, Kieft and Koeman.

Abroad
Aged 29, Vanenburg had his first abroad experience, helping Júbilo Iwata promote to the J1 League in his first year then playing a further two seasons with them. He finished the 1996–97 campaign back in his country, still being relatively played as hometown's FC Utrecht ranked in 12th position.

Until his retirement in 2000 at the age of 36, Vanenburg played three more years of top flight football, with AS Cannes (France) and TSV 1860 Munich (Germany), where he began appearing regularly as a sweeper.

International career
Vanenburg made his debut for the Netherlands on 14 April 1982 at only 18, playing the full 90 minutes of a 1–0 friendly win with Greece, in Eindhoven. Vanenburg was a member of the Dutch squad at the 1983 FIFA World Youth Championship. He was selected for the UEFA Euro 1988 tournament in West Germany, appearing in all the games as the Oranje won the competition.

Vanenburg was also picked by manager Leo Beenhakker for his 1990 FIFA World Cup squad, but his contribution consisted of 45 minutes against Egypt (1–1 group stage draw), in an eventual round-of-16 exit in Italy. His last international appearance came as a substitute in a 2–2 draw to Poland on 14 October 1992, in Rotterdam in a 1994 World Cup qualification match.

Coaching career
After leaving 1860 Munich, Vanenburg immediately returned to PSV where he was appointed the youth team's manager but, during that timeframe, also managed former club TSV during three months, starting in April 2004, with the team eventually being relegated from the Bundesliga.

In 2006–07, Vanenburg coached Helmond Sport in the Eerste Divisie, being fired on 17 February 2007. On 1 January of the following year he was appointed at another club in the category, FC Eindhoven.

Personal life
Vanenburg was the nephew of former Surinamese international player and manager Roy Vanenburg. The latter was considered one of the greatest footballers in the country's history, having won the SVB Hoofdklasse title six times and the CONCACAF Champions' Cup twice with S.V. Transvaal.

Career statistics

Club

International

Scores and results list the Netherlands' goal tally first, score column indicates score after each Vanenburg goal.

Honours
Ajax
Eredivisie: 1981–82, 1982–83, 1984–85
KNVB Cup: 1982–83, 1985–86

PSV
European Cup: 1987–88
Eredivisie: 1986–87, 1987–88, 1988–89, 1990–91, 1991–92
KNVB Cup: 1987–88, 1988–89, 1989–90
Johan Cruijff Shield: 1992

Netherlands
UEFA European Championship: 1988

Individual
Dutch Golden Boot: 1988, 1989

References

External links

Beijen profile 

1964 births
Living people
Dutch sportspeople of Surinamese descent
Footballers from Utrecht (city)
Dutch footballers
Association football defenders
Association football wingers
Association football utility players
Eredivisie players
USV Elinkwijk players
AFC Ajax players
PSV Eindhoven players
FC Utrecht players
J1 League players
Japan Football League (1992–1998) players
Júbilo Iwata players
Ligue 1 players
AS Cannes players
Bundesliga players
TSV 1860 Munich players
Netherlands youth international footballers
Netherlands international footballers
UEFA Euro 1988 players
1990 FIFA World Cup players
UEFA European Championship-winning players
Dutch expatriate footballers
Expatriate footballers in Japan
Expatriate footballers in France
Expatriate footballers in Germany
Dutch expatriate sportspeople in Japan
Dutch expatriate sportspeople in France
Dutch expatriate sportspeople in Germany
Dutch football managers
Bundesliga managers
TSV 1860 Munich managers
Helmond Sport managers
FC Eindhoven managers
Dutch expatriate football managers
Willem II (football club) non-playing staff